The Pennine Amateur Rugby League, or Pennine League is a rugby league competition for amateur open-age clubs that runs from September to April. The clubs are drawn from West Yorkshire, North Yorkshire, South Yorkshire and the east of Lancashire.

The league is run by the British Amateur Rugby League Association (BARLA). Teams from the Pennine League can apply for election to the National Conference League if they meet minimum criteria.

History

Following the formation of British Amateur Rugby League Association in 1973, local District Leagues got together and pooled their resources. The Pennine league was formed by a merger of Bradford, Halifax, Huddersfield, Oldham and
Rochdale districts.

Structure
For the 2011–2012 season, there were 106 teams within the Pennine League structure, organised into nine divisions. The number of teams has increased by 24 over the past four years in large part due to the demise of the CMS Yorkshire League.

There are also three cup competitions:
 The Pennine Presidents Cup (Premier Division to Div 1)
 The Andrew Bennett Memorial Trophy (Divisions 2 to 4)
 The Pennine Supplementary Cup (Divisions 5 to 7)

The winners of the Premier League are entered into the Challenge Cup First qualifying round in the following season.

The current league structure is as follows:

Premier Division 
  Beeston Broncos 
  Dewsbury Moor
  Drighlington
  Halifax Irish
  Hunslet Club Parkside
  Queens
  Queensbury
  Sharlston Rovers
  Slaithwaite Saracens
  Thornhill Trojans
  Wibsey Warriors

Championship 
  Bank Top Harriers
  Keighley
  King Cross Park
  Knottingley Rockware Stolze
  Moorends Thorne Marauders
  Nevison Leap
  New Earswick All Blacks
  Ossett Trinity
  St.Joseph's
  West Bowling
  Westgate Wolves

Division One 
  Allerton Bywater
  Batley Boys
  Bentley Good Companions
  Birkenshaw
  Brighouse Rangers
  Methley Royals
  Morley Borough
  Newsome Panthers
  Sharleston Rovers (A)
  Upton

Division Two 
  Boothtown Terriers
  Brotherton Bulldogs
  Clayton
  Dodworth
  Doncaster Toll Bar
  Emley Moor
  Illingworth
  Lindley Swifts
  Troydale Trojans
  Underbank Rangers
  West Craven Warriors
  Wyke

Division Three 
  Greetland Allrounders
  Hoyland Vikings
  Littleborough
  Odsal Sedbergh
  Pontefract Sports & Social Club
  Selby Warriors
  Silsden
  Shaw Cross Sharks
  Stainland Stags
  West Leeds
  Woodhouse Warriors
  Wortley Dragons

Division Four 
  Dearne Valley Bulldogs
  Drighlington (A)
  Farnley Falcons
  Knottingley Kellingley Welfare
  New Earswick All Blacks A
  Queensbury (A)
  Siddal
  Thornhill Trojans (A)
  Undercliffe Wildboars
  Victoria Rangers
  Whitehall Warriors
  Wibsey Warriors (A)

Division Five 
  Brighouse Rangers (A)
  Burley Lions
  Crofton Cougars
  Eastmoor Dragons
  Hanging Heaton
  Hollinwood
  Hunslet Old Boys A
  Meltham All Blacks
  Newsome Panthers A
  Slaithwaite Saracens (A)
  Whinmoor

Division Six 
  Harehills
  King Cross Park (A)
  Kinsley Raiders
  Rodley Rockets
  Ryhill Hammers
  Sherburn Bears
  Wakefield City
  West Bowling (A)
  Wetherby Bulldogs
  Whitworth Spartans
  Worth Village

Division Six West 2014/15 
  Boothtown Terriers (A)
  Cowling Harlequins
  Greetland All Rounders (A)
  Illingworth (A)
  Kings Cross Park (A)
  Meltham All Blacks 
  Odsal Sedburgh (A)
  Queensbury (B)
  Victoria Rangers (A)
  Worth Village
  Wyke (A)

Notes:
Siddal, Shaw Cross, Eastmoor Dragons and Castleford Panthers enter their first team in the National Conference League.

Past winners

Premier Division
2013–14 Hunslet Old boys

Championship Division
2012–3 Keighley

First Division
2012–3 Methley Royals

Second Division 
2012–3 Illingworth

Third Division 
2012–3 West Leeds

Fourth Division
2012–3 Siddal

Fifth Division 
2012–3 Hanging Heaton

Sixth Division 
2012–3 West Bowling A

Seventh Division 
2012–3 Garforth Tigers

Pennine Presidents Cup 
2016–17 Fryston Warriors

Andrew Bennett Memorial Trophy
2016–17 Brighouse Rangers

Pennine Supplementary Cup 
2016–17 Allerton Bywater

See also

 British Amateur Rugby League Association
 British rugby league system
 National Conference League
 North West Counties
 CMS Yorkshire league
 Cumberland League
 Hull & District League
 Barrow & District League

External links
Official website – latest results and tables
 BARLA Official Website

BARLA competitions
Rugby league competitions in Yorkshire
Rugby league in Lancashire
Rugby league in Greater Manchester